Lockerbie is a town in south-west Scotland.

Lockerbie may also refer to:

 Lockerbie bombing, the terrorist bombing of Pan Am Flight 103 in December 1988
 Lockerbie: The Story and the Lessons, a book focussing on the civil litigation against Pan Am

Places
 Lockerbie railway station
 Lockerbie Square, Indianapolis, Indiana, US
 Lockerbie Square Historic District
 Lockerbie Scrub, Queensland, Australia
 Lockerbie, Victoria, a proposed suburb of Melbourne, Australia
People
 Gary Lockerbie (born 1982), British golfer

See also
 Lockerby (disambiguation)